Noblesse oblige (literally “nobility obliges”) is a French expression that retains in English the meaning that nobility extends beyond mere entitlement, requiring people who hold such status to fulfill social responsibilities. For example, a primary obligation of a nobleman could include generosity towards those around him. As those who lived on the nobles' land had obligations to the nobility, the nobility had obligations to their people, including protection at the least.

According to the Oxford English Dictionary, the term suggests "noble ancestry constrains to honourable behaviour; privilege entails responsibility." The Dictionnaire de l'Académie française defines it thus:
 Whoever claims to be noble must conduct himself nobly.
 (Figuratively) One must act in a fashion that conforms to one's position and privileges with which one has been born, bestowed and/or has earned.

OED and others cite the source of the phrase as Maxims (1808) by Pierre Marc Gaston de Lévis, Duke of Lévis.

Meaning and variants 
Noblesse oblige is generally used to imply that wealth, power, and prestige come with responsibilities. In ethical discussion, the term is sometimes used to summarize a moral economy wherein privilege must be balanced by duty towards those who lack such privilege or who cannot perform such duty. Recently, it has been used to refer to public responsibilities of the rich, famous and powerful, notably to provide good examples of behaviour or exceed minimal standards of decency. It has also been used to describe a person taking the blame for something in order to solve an issue or save someone else.

History and examples

 
An early instance of this concept in literature may be found in Homer's Iliad. In Book XII, the hero Sarpedon delivers a speech in which he urges his comrade Glaucus to fight with him in the front ranks of battle. In Pope's translation, Sarpedon exhorts Glaucus thus:

'Tis ours, the dignity they give to grace
The first in valour, as the first in place;
That when with wondering eyes our confidential bands
Behold our deeds transcending our commands,
Such, they may cry, deserve the sovereign state,
Whom those that envy dare not imitate!

In Le Lys dans la Vallée, written in 1835 and published in 1836, Honoré de Balzac recommends certain standards of behaviour to a young man, concluding: "Everything I have just told you can be summarized by an old word: noblesse oblige!" His advice included "others will respect you for detesting people who have done detestable things."

The phrase is carved into Bertram Goodhue's Los Angeles Public Library on a sculpture by Lee Lawrie as part of Hartley Burr Alexander's iconographic scheme for the building.

In the song "The Life I Lead" from the 1964 Disney film Mary Poppins, the character Mr Banks (played by David Tomlinson) uses the phrase: "I'm the lord of my castle! The sovereign! The liege! I treat my subjects, servants, children, wife, with a firm but gentle hand. Noblesse oblige."

Critique
Some critics have argued that noblesse oblige, while imposing on the nobility a duty to behave nobly, gives the aristocracy a justification for their privilege. Jurists Dias and Hohfeld have pointed out that rights and duties are jural corelatives, which means that if someone has a right, someone else owes them a duty. Dias's reasoning was used in Murphy v Brentwood District Council (1991) to disapprove Lord Denning MR's judgment in Dutton v Bognor Regis Urban District Council (1972).

See also

 Chivalry
 Euergetism
 Honour
 "The Gospel of Wealth"
 Liturgy (ancient Greece)
 Mandate of Heaven
 National Honor Society (USA)
 Paternalistic conservatism
 The White Man's Burden
 With great power comes great responsibility

References
Notes

Sources
 Oxford English Dictionary (1989). New York: Oxford University Press.
 
 The Scarlet Pimpernel (film, 1982). London Film Productions Limited. 2003 DVD ID#191LFDVD.

Feudalism
French words and phrases
Mottos
Nobility

sv:Lista över franska uttryck i svenska språket#N